Habib Ullah Sarkar is a Bangladeshi politician of the Bangladesh Nationalist Party who served as Member of Parliament for Mymensingh-9 and Mymensingh-6.

Career
Sarkar was elected to parliament from Mymensingh-9 as a Bangladesh Nationalist Party candidate in 1979. He joined the Jatiya Party in 1988. He was elected to parliament from Mymensingh-6 as an Independent candidate in 1988 Bangladeshi general election.

In the fifth national election of 1991, he was defeated as a Jatiya Party candidate from Mymensingh-6 constituency. In the June 1996 Bangladeshi general election, he was defeated as an Independent candidate from Mymensingh-6 constituency.

References

Bangladesh Nationalist Party politicians
Living people
2nd Jatiya Sangsad members
4th Jatiya Sangsad members
Year of birth missing (living people)
Jatiya Party politicians
People from Mymensingh District